Courter may refer to:

Courter, Indiana, an unincorporated town
Amy Courter, former National Commander of the Civil Air Patrol
Gay Courter, American film writer, author, and novelist. 
Jim Courter, American politician